Dinesh Nandan Sahay (also known as D.N. Sahay) (2 February 1936 – 28 January 2018) was a police officer turned politician and served as DGP of Bihar and later as Governor of Tripura and Governor of Chhattisgarh.

He was born in Madhepur, Bihar in a middle-class family to mother late Kishori Devi and father late Deva Nandan Sahay and raised in Patna. He completed his M.A. in English literature and started his career as a lecturer in the H.D. College of Arrah before joining Indian Police Service in 1960. Thereafter, he served as the DGP of Bihar state (India).
He was married to Manju Sahay and the couple has one son and two daughters.

After retirement he joined the Samata Party (Uday Mandal is current President). He was the first governor of  Chhattisgarh state from 2000 to 2003. He became Governor of Tripura in June 2003. He continued on this post till 2009. Yet traditionally governors serve for five years' tenure, but Mr. Sahay was an exception.

References 

1936 births
2018 deaths
Indian police officers
Governors of Chhattisgarh
Governors of Tripura
Politicians from Patna
20th-century Indian politicians
21st-century Indian politicians
Samata Party politicians
Janata Dal (United) politicians